Vrančić is a Croatian surname, and may refer to:

Antun Vrančić (1504–1573), Croatian cardinal, writer and diplomat
Damir Vrančić (born 1985), Bosnian-Herzegovinian footballer
Faust Vrančić (1551–1617), Croatian scientist and inventor
Mario Vrančić (born 1989), Bosnian-Herzegovinian and German footballer
Vjekoslav Vrančić (1904–1990), Croatian politician